Schopfloch is a municipality in the district of Freudenstadt in Baden-Württemberg in southern Germany. It is located in the northern part of the Black Forest (Schwarzwald).

Schopfloch consists of three communities: Schopfloch, Oberiflingen and Unteriflingen.

References 

Freudenstadt (district)
Württemberg